Warwick Rimmer (born 1 March 1941) is an English former professional football player and coach. In a playing career which lasted from 1960 to 1979, Rimmer made nearly 600 professional league appearances for Bolton Wanderers and Crewe Alexandra, as a defender.

Career

Playing career
Born in Birkenhead, Rimmer signed a youth contract with Bolton Wanderers at the age of fifteen. He began his professional career four years later in 1960, making a total of 469 league appearances for Bolton,. Rimmer later became club captain, and lifted the trophy for Bolton when they won the 1972–73 Third Division Championship. Rimmer also played for Crewe Alexandra between 1974 and 1979, making 128 league appearances.

Coaching career
Rimmer managed Crewe Alexandra between 1978 and 1979. After retiring as a player, Rimmer became the coach of the Sierra Leone national side. Rimmer also founded the Youth Section of Tranmere Rovers in 1987.

The young players that Rimmer has nurtured have earned Tranmere Rovers an estimated £14 million.

References
General
 

Specific

1941 births
Living people
English footballers
English football managers
Bolton Wanderers F.C. players
Crewe Alexandra F.C. players
Crewe Alexandra F.C. managers
English Football League managers
Expatriate football managers in Sierra Leone
Sierra Leone national football team managers
Tranmere Rovers F.C. non-playing staff
Association football defenders